Edge of the Cedars State Park Museum is a state park and museum of Utah, USA, located in Blanding. It is an Ancestral Puebloan archaeological site, a museum, and an archaeological repository. Cowboys from the nearby town of Bluff camped there in the late 19th century and called the site Edge of the Cedars because it sits on the edge of a natural boundary, separating a heavily forested region and a treeless landscape to the south. Cedar is a term locals use for the Utah juniper tree.

Because of its archaeological significance, the site was designated a State Historical Monument in 1970 and was listed on the National Register of Historic Places as the Edge of Cedars Indian Ruin in 1971. In 1974, the Utah Navajo Development Council donated the  site to the Division of Utah State Parks and Recreation. Shortly thereafter the Utah Legislature enabled the establishment of Edge of the Cedars State Park as a museum of Indian history and culture. The museum opened in 1978. The archaeological repository was completed in 1994. Today, the facility serves as the primary repository for archaeological materials excavated from public lands in southeast Utah, and includes archives and a research library.

References

External links

 Edge of the Cedars State Park Museum

Archaeological museums in Utah
Archaeological sites on the National Register of Historic Places in Utah
Museums in San Juan County, Utah
Native American museums in Utah
Protected areas established in 1974
Protected areas of San Juan County, Utah
State parks of Utah
1974 establishments in Utah
National Register of Historic Places in San Juan County, Utah